Junuthula N. Reddy (born 12 August 1945) is a Distinguished Professor, Regent's Professor, and inaugural holder of the Oscar S. Wyatt Endowed Chair in Mechanical Engineering at Texas A&M University, College Station, Texas, USA.[1] He is an authoritative figure in the broad area of mechanics and one of the researchers responsible for the development of the Finite Element Method (FEM). He has made significant seminal contributions in the areas of finite element method, plate theory, solid mechanics, variational methods, mechanics of composites, functionally graded materials, fracture mechanics, plasticity, biomechanics, classical and non-Newtonian fluid mechanics, and applied functional analysis. Reddy has over 620 journal papers and 20 books (with several second and third editions) and has given numerous (over 150) national and international talks. He served as a member of the International Advisory Committee at ICTACEM, in 2001 and keynote addressing in 2014.[2][3]

He has advised around 36 postdoctoral fellows, 65 PhD students, and 46 M.S students over 40 years. Many of his (former) PhD and postdoctoral students are currently faculty members in major universities throughout the world. He has been listed as an ISI Highly Cited Author in Engineering by the ISI Web of Knowledge, Thomson Scientific Company. Reddy is one of the original top 100 ISI Highly Cited Researchers in Engineering around world, with h-index of over 66 as per Web of Science; the number of citations is over 54,000 with h-index of 94 and i10-index of 438 (i.e., 438 papers are cited at least 10 times) as per Google Scholar.

Education

 Post Doctoral Fellow, Texas Institute for Computational Mechanics, University of Texas at Austin, 1973–1974.
 PhD. - Engineering Mechanics (Advisor: Dr. J. Tinsley Oden), University of Alabama in Huntsville, Alabama, 1973.
 M.S. - Mechanical Engineering, Oklahoma State University, Stillwater, Oklahoma, 1970.
 B.E. - Mechanical Engineering, Osmania University, Hyderabad, Andhra Pradesh, India, 1968.

Awards
Timoshenko Medal, American Society of Mechanical Engineers, 2019.
ASME Medal, American Society of Mechanical Engineers, 2016.
Prager Medal, Society of Engineering Science (medal to be presented at 53rd Annual Technical Meeting at University of Maryland, 4–6 October 2016).
Simpson Distinguished Visiting Professor, Department of Mechanical Engineering, Northwestern University, April–May, 2016.
Inductee, The Hall of Fame of the College of Engineering, Architecture and Technology, Oklahoma State University, Stillwater, 17 October 2015.
Foreign Fellow, the Indian National Academy of Engineering, September 2015.
Special Sessions organized in honor of Professor JN Reddy at the Eighth International Conference on Advances in Steel Structures (ICASS) and IJSSD Symposium on Progress in Structural Stability and Dynamics, held in Lisbon, Portugal, 22–24 July 2015, Technical University of Lisbon, Portugal (a special issue of the International Journal of Structural Stability and Dynamics in honor of JN Reddy is published).
Special Sessions organized in honor of Professor JN Reddy at the 18th International Conference on Composite Structures, held in Lisbon, Portugal, 15–18 June 2015, Lisbon, Portugal (a special issue of the Composite Structures journal in honor of JN Reddy is planned).
The IACM O.C. Zienkiewicz Award from the International Association for Computational Mechanics, 2014.
Raymond D. Mindlin Medal from the American Society of Civil Engineers, 2014.
Finland Distinguished Professor (FiDiPro), Aalto University and National Technology Agency of Finland (Tekes), 2014–2018.
Visiting Professor of the Science without Borders Program of Brazil (University of São Paulo), 2014–2016.
Chair of Excellence, Universidad Carlos III de Madrid, Spain, 2014–2015.Elected to prestigious NAE (Class of 2015) for contributions to composite structures and to engineering education and practice.
Distinguished Visiting Fellowship, The Royal Academy of Engineering, London, UK, 2013.
Satish Dhawan Visiting Professor, Department of Aerospace Engineering, Indian Institute of Science, Bangalore, 2012–2013.
Computational Mechanics Award, the Japanese Society of Mechanical Engineers (JSME), October 2012.
Top 100 Scientists, International Biographical Centre, Cambridge, England, 2012.
Honorary Doctorate Degree, Odlar Yurdu University, Baku, Azerbaijan, 2011.
Life Fellow, American Society of Mechanical Engineers (ASME), June 2011.
Regents' Professor, Texas A&M University, College Station, Texas, 2010.
Honorary degree (Honoris Causa) from the Technical University of Lisbon, Portugal, 2009.
Fellow of American Institute of Aeronautical and Astronautics, 2005.
Distinguished Research Award of the American Society for Composites, 2004.
Computational Solids Mechanics award for the US Association for Computational Mechanics, 2003.
Outstanding Man of the 21st century, 2000.
The Nathan M. Newmark medal from the American Society of Civil Engineering, 1998.
Fellow of the International Association of Computational Mechanics, 1998.
Charles Russ Richards Memorial Award, the American Society of Mechanical Engineers, 1995.
Men of Achievement, 1994.

Books
J. T. Oden and J. N. Reddy, A Mathematical Theory of Finite Elements, Wiley-Interscience (1976)
J. T. Oden and J. N. Reddy, Variational Methods in Theoretical Mechanics, 2nd ed., Springer-Verlag (1982)
J. N. Reddy and M. L. Rasmussen, Advanced Engineering Analysis, John Wiley (1982) reprinted by Krieger, Melbourne, FL, 1990
J. N. Reddy, Applied Functional Analysis and Variational Methods in Engineering, McGraw-Hill (1986); reprinted by Krieger, Melbourne (1991)
O. O. Ochoa and J. N. Reddy, Finite Element Analysis of Composite Laminates, 2nd ed., Kluwer Academic Publishers, The Netherlands (1992) 
J. N. Reddy and A. Miravete, Practical Analysis of Laminated Composite Structures, 3rd ed., CRC Press, FL, 1995. 
C. M. Wang, J. N. Reddy and K.H. Lee, Shear Deformation Theories of Beams and Plates Dynamics Relationships with Classical Solution, Elsevier, U.K., 2000. 
J. N. Reddy, Energy Principles and Variational Methods in Applied Mechanics, 2nd ed., John Wiley (2002) , 3rd edition to appear in 2017.
J. N. Reddy, An Introduction to Nonlinear Finite Element Analysis, Oxford University Press, USA (2004). 
J. N. Reddy, Mechanics of Laminated Composite Plates and Shells: Theory and Analysis, 2nd ed., CRC Press (2004). 
J. N. Reddy, An Introduction to the Finite Element Method, 3rd ed., McGraw-Hill Education (2005). 
J. N. Reddy and D. K. Gartling, The Finite Element Method in Heat Transfer and Fluid Dynamics, 3rd ed., CRC Press, FL, 2010. 
J. N. Reddy, Theory and Analysis of Elastic Plates and Shells, 2nd ed., Taylor & Francis (2007) 
C. M. Wang, C. Y. Wang, and J. N. Reddy, Exact Solutions for Buckling of Structural Members, CRC Press (2005) 
J. N. Reddy, Principles of Continuum Mechanics. A Study of Conservation Principles with Applications, Cambridge University Press (2010) 
R. T. Fenner and J. N. Reddy, Mechanics of Solids and Structures, 2nd ed., CRC Press (2012) 
J. N. Reddy, An Introduction to Continuum Mechanics with Applications, 2nd ed., Cambridge University Press (2013) 
J. N. Reddy, An Introduction to Nonlinear Finite Element Analysis, 2nd ed., Oxford University Press (2015) 
K.S. Surana and J.N. Reddy, The Finite Element Method for Boundary Value Problems, Mathematics and Computations, CRC Press, to appear (2017)

References

External links

1945 births
Living people
Texas A&M University faculty
Oklahoma State University alumni
Osmania University alumni
University of Alabama alumni
Indian emigrants to the United States
Fellows of the American Institute of Aeronautics and Astronautics
Foreign members of the Chinese Academy of Engineering
People from Hanamkonda district
ASME Medal recipients
American academics of Indian descent
Indian scholars